Kāhala, is a neighborhood in Honolulu, Hawaii. Kahala contains a large concentration of expensive real estate and beachfront properties, which include some of the most expensive in the entire state. Kahala consists of approximately 1,200 homes.  The neighborhood is considered a “cinderella story” because it went from farmland to one of the nicest neighborhoods on Oahu.

Kahala is also home to the Kahala Hotel & Resort, formerly known as the Kahala Mandarin Oriental, and prior to the Kahala Hilton. Also located along the borders are Kahala Mall, and Diamond Head crater.

There are a variety of residents of many ages, the newer arrivals to the island generally own the more modern and spacious homes, though many of the older homes are beautiful and finely aged. Many celebrities and Business persons have also bought vacation homes in the area. Kahala is a favored spot for investors to purchase and renovate homes to sell. In 2006, typical prices for a house in Kahala ranged from $1.4 million to $1.7 million, with beachfront land going for substantially more.

Kahala is a flat area of Honolulu, within a 5 – 15 minutes drive of Waikiki and downtown.

History
1795 - King Kamehameha’s canoes started landing in Kahala in his effort to unite the islands. After he conquered Oahu, many Native Hawaiians started settling on the island.

1800s - Kahala became the primary location for cattle and pig farms on Oahu because it was one of the few completely flat areas on the island. 

During WW1 (1914-1918) - Forests in Kahala were cleared.

Post WW1 (1918) - The upper class started to discover Kahala and wanted to gentrify the area. Farms were shut down, and ponds were filled in to make way for the new mansions that started being built.

Post WW2 (1948) - Kahala was subdivided and it became Waialae-Kahala.

1964 - Kahala Hilton Hotel was built even though there was much opposition from the local residents. 

1986 - Homeowners in Kahala were finally able to buy their land from the Bishop Estate, and no longer had to lease their property.

1980s - Genshiro Kawamoto, a billionaire from Japan, bought 31 lots in Kahala. Instead of living in them, he demolished them, let them sit vacantly, or turned them into the Kahala Avenue Mission. His presence in Kahala created lots of problems within the community, but in 2013, he sold all his Kahala properties to a local real estate and investment company.

Old Kahala
Farmers road was home to Taylor’s Chicken Farm. It was considered a gathering place for local Kahala residents. There was a pavilion at the end of the road where dances, parties, and hula classes were held. On Farmers road, there were lots of stables and pig farms. Doris Duke started a hydroponic garden on it where they raised fruit and vegetables. In the past, vendors used to come to each neighborhood with trucks that could display their wings. They mainly sold vegetables but also brought fish and eggs. Times were different back then because leaving your door unlocked for the milk and meat man was expected. Furthermore, any kitchen scraps were left outside for the pig farmers to feed their livestock. There used to be more greenery in the neighborhood because there were lots of coconut trees, and there used to be a grove of mango trees where Kahala School is now. Farmers road is one of the few parts of Kahala that remains today and reminds us of how much this neighborhood has changed in the last century.

Government
City Council District IV, Tommy Waters
Hawaii State House of Representatives, District 18, Mark Hashem
Hawaii State House of Representatives, District 19, Bertrand Kobayashi
Hawaii State Senate, District 9, Stanley Chang

Education
 Hawaii Department of Education operates Kahala's public schools.
 Kahala Elementary School is located in the neighborhood.
 Kalani High School serves high school students in Kahala .
 Star of the Sea is a Catholic K-8 private school.

References 

Neighborhoods in Honolulu
Upper class culture in the United States